To the Beautiful You is a 2012 South Korean television drama series starring Sulli, Choi Min-ho, and Lee Hyun-woo. It aired on SBS from 15 August to 4 October 2012 on Wednesdays and Thursdays at 21:55 (KST) for 16 episodes.

It is based on the Japanese shōjo manga series, written by Hisaya Nakajo. The Korean series is the fourth television adaptation of the manga following the Taiwanese Hanazakarino Kimitachihe in 2006, the Japanese Hanazakari no Kimitachi e in 2007 and its remake Hanazakari no Kimitachi e 2011.

Plot
The story of To the Beautiful You, distributed over 16 episodes, centers on Goo Jae-hee (Sulli), a Korean girl who lives in the United States. She is bullied in school due to her looks and nearly decides to drop out of school. One day, she sees a track and field competition on TV, and becomes attracted to one of the high jump competitors, Kang Tae-joon (Choi Min-ho). She begins to idolize the young athlete, and is inspired to participate in sports and to stand up against her foes. She eventually transfers to Korea to attend the same school that Tae-joon, who has recently suffered an accident that could potentially end his career. There is a catch, however: Tae-joon attends an all-boys high school, Genie High School, so Jae-hee cuts her hair short and disguises herself as a boy to enter the school.

Episodes 1–5 
In Genie High School, Jae-hee encounters Tae-joon, who is repulsed by her behavior, and befriends soccer athlete Cha Eun-gyeol (Lee Hyun-woo) after a brief brawl with an aggressive muscle boy in the bathroom. Ha Seung-ri (Seo Jun-young), dormitory captain of Dormitory 2, assigns Jae-hee as roommates with Tae-joon. Disgusted of having a roommate, Tae-joon challenges Jae-hee to score a goal in a soccer game so that she will be admitted as his roommate. Jae-hee is injured in the match and is brought to the school infirmary, where the infirmary custodian Teacher Jang Min-woo (Ki Tae-young) becomes the first to discover Jae-hee's true identity. Jae-hee reveals her purpose of coming to Genie High School and pleads for her secret to be kept, to which Teacher Jang, realizing Jae-hee's resolve, hesitatingly accepts.

Jae-hee begins to adapt with the school and her schoolmates, gradually gaining Tae-joon's favor and of the entire Dormitory 2 when she won in a marathon match. A confused Eun-gyeol begins to doubt his sexuality when he begins to feel attracted to Jae-hee, not knowing she is a girl. Tae-joon, who already have hints on Jae-hee's real gender, saves her from being raped during a trip at Seung-ri's place.

When Jae-hee's older half-brother, Daniel Dawson (Julien Kang), comes to Korea, he finds out what his little sister is doing. Daniel soon decides to make Jae-hee leave the school. Jae-hee and Daniel argue in her and Tae-joon's room, and Tae-joon overhears their conversation, and discovers Jae-hee's secret. Tae-joon sends her out, but he later appreciates her candid efforts in helping him in his athletic career when he discovers a video email that she sent to Canadian high jump coach Mr. Holten, which also contains a brief narration of Jae-hee's bitter life in America and her anticipation to see Tae-joon jump again. Tae-joon pleads Jae-hee not to leave him behind. Teacher Jang, then, convinces Daniel Dawson to trust Jae-hee and to let her stay in Genie High School.

Episodes 6–11 
Fueled by the inspiration Jae-hee brought upon him, Tae-joon struggles to recover from his nearly lost career in high-jumping. With Jae-hee's constant support, Tae-joon's cold personality changes and he starts to develop feelings for her, despite negative reactions from his childhood friend, renowned gymnast Seol Han-na (Kim Ji-won), who anticipates having Tae-joon as her boyfriend. On the other hand, Eun-gyeol has rejected the love offered to him by his childhood friend Hong Da-hae (Nam Ji-hyun) and insists on affirming his love for Jae-hee. As they become closer to each other, Tae-joon reveals to Jae-hee about the death of his mother, which he blames on his father's indifference. The competition over who takes Jae-hee intensifies as her childhood friend and suitor John Kim arrives from America for a photo project in Korea. John Kim (Kim Woo-bin) attempts to talk Tae-joon down, but Jae-hee personally rejects his love.

Later, Han-na learns of Jae-hee's true identity after reading a secretly acquired yearbook of Jae-hee's previous school in America. Teacher Jang attempts to stop her from revealing the truth to no avail. The angered Han-na threatens Tae-joon to have her as a date before she kicks Jae-hee out of Genie High School. Tae-joon reluctantly consents, consequently receiving negative responses from the public. Later on, Han-na severely injures her ankle during a rehearsal and is feared incapable to do gymnastics anymore. She finally rejects Tae-joon, just as Eun-gyeol confesses his love for Jae-hee.

Episodes 12–15 
Confused on what to do after Eun-gyeol's confession, Jae-hee asks advice from Teacher Jang. Along with his fellow teachers, Teacher Jang brings Jae-hee, Tae-joon, and Eun-gyeol to the countryside for volunteer work, thinking it will lessen the tension between the trio. After the trip, Tae-joon reveals to Teacher Jang his plan to confess his love for Jae-hee and to admit to her that he knew all along that she is a girl.
Meanwhile, Tae-joon's training partner and fellow high jumper Min Hyeon-jae (Kang Ha-neul) gets stressed over the competition between them and attempts to sabotage him. Instead, his efforts nearly killed Jae-hee and injured Eun-gyeol, rendering the latter incapable of playing an incoming soccer match. Hyeon-jae reveals to the Eun-gyeol (who was his roommate) his fears of defeat and disheartening his own family. Eun-gyeol forgives Hyeon-jae to the condition that he shall put him under his servitude until he heals from his injury. Tae-joon dismisses Hyeon-jae's offensive acts and encourages him not to withdraw from his sports career.

Soon after, Jae-hee talks to Tae-joon about making up with his father, Kang Geun-wook (Sunwoo Jae-duk). Tae-joon learns from Geun-wook the truth about his mother's death: his mother's condition was unbeknown to both Tae-joon and Geun-wook, and when she died, Geun-wook decided to let Tae-joon blame him for her death. Tae-joon reconciles with his father, and his performance in high jumping boosted as the date of the National competition approached. Just then, Eun-gyeol unexpectedly discovers Jae-hee's identity and felt betrayed for not being told of the truth. Tae-joon comforts a troubled Jae-hee, reveals that he had known all along that she is a girl, and finally confesses his love for her.

Later, gossips of a girl hiding in Genie High School began to spread and the captains of Dormitory 1 and 3 starts to search the locker rooms to confirm the rumor. Eun-gyeol hears of their plan and hides Jae-hee before the dormitory captains were able to see her changing clothes in the locker room. Eun-gyeol lets go of his anger and accepts the reality that he and Jae-hee cannot be together, telling Jae-hee of his happiness he felt when he learned that she was a girl.

Episode 16 & Epilogue 
Merely two days before Tae-joon's match, Jae-hee faints at school and her identity is revealed when students try to revive her. Seung-ri scolds Jae-hee for what she had done, though, out of loyalty for his own dormitory, he takes the responsibility of Jae-hee's case. Knowing that the truth will soon be brought to the school head, she plans to leave the school behind for good and scheduled her flight on the day of the National competition. She spends his last night and shares a kiss with the unknowing Tae-joon, who was in the arena during the incident.

On the day of her departure, Eun-gyeol, Seung-ri, and the entire Dormitory 2 gives their last messages to Jae-hee and bids her farewell. Tae-joon learns from Eun-gyeol about Jea-hee's departure. Just as he was about to leave the arena, he saw Jae-hee's diary inside his bag and is inspired to do the jump without her. Miraculously, Tae-joon emerges victorious in the match and vows to Jae-hee on the live cameras that he shall see her once again.

A year later in the United States, Jae-hee gets updates from Eun-gyeol through his video emails. At the end of the episode, Jae-hee unexpectedly meets Tae-joon and they happily share a hug.

Cast

Main

Supporting

Students

Others

Special appearances
 Sang-chu as muscle student 
 EXO-K as themselves in a performance (Ep. 2)
 Go Soo-hee as woman at school cafeteria (Ep. 2)
 Hong Rok-gi as DJ in charge of the party (Ep. 2)
 Park Tae-sung as Chang-yeon (Ep. 3–4)
 Jung Yoo-geun as Jae-gyul (Ep. 4)
 LEDApple as Shut Up band (Ep. 6)
 Seo Kang-joon as student on dormitory 3 (Ep. 3 & 7)

Production

Casting
On 10 March 2011, SM Entertainment announced that they had acquired the rights to the manga, "Hana Kimi" and would be filming its Korean adaptation. Representatives revealed, "The Korean version will have a total of 16 episodes that draw out stories of hopes and dreams. It's a teenage comedy with a cute, but strong storyline and a slew of handsome cast members."

On 26 April, it was announced that Shinee's Choi Min-ho and f(x)'s Sulli are cast in the lead roles, and directed by Jeon Ki-sang who had previously directed the hit dramas My Girl and Boys Over Flowers. On 24 May 2012, it was further announced that the title is To The Beautiful You and written by Lee Young-chul, who wrote the High Kick! series. On 6 June, it was announced that Infinite's L was reviewing the offer to join, but would have to juggle overseas schedules with filming. After previous discussions for the secondary male lead role, Lee Hyun-woo was finally confirmed as Cha Eun-gyul.

Filming
The first script reading took place on 7 June at SBS Ilsan Production Center. On 9 July Minho, Sulli, Kwanghee and members of EXO were spotted taking part in a photoshoot for the drama. In preparation for his role as Tae-joon, Minho received personal training from coach Kim Tae-young, former national high jump athlete and a member of the Korea Association of Athletics Federations, for a month and a half. His personal record at the end of July was 175 cm.

Filming began at the beginning of July. In an interview with Vogue Girl Korea, Minho confirmed that the drama would broadcast on 15 August, rather than the initially scheduled 8 August. MokWon University was used to film the scenes in Genie Athletic High School, and Anmyeondo was used to film the summer vacation scenes. The first scene Choi Min-ho filmed was a high jump scene. For the high jump scene, 105 high-speed cameras were used to film in bullet time.

Original soundtrack

Ratings
According to AGB Nielsen Media Research, the premiere episode achieved a nationwide rating of 7.4 percent in viewership, behind its rival Arang and the Magistrate on MBC with 13.3 percent for its premiere episode and 19.4 percent for Bridal Mask on KBS.
 In the table below,  represent the lowest ratings and  represent the highest ratings.
NR denotes that the drama did not rank in the top 20 daily programs on that date.

References

External links
To the Beautiful You official SBS website 

2012 South Korean television series debuts
2012 South Korean television series endings
Seoul Broadcasting System television dramas
Korean-language television shows
South Korean television dramas based on manga
Television series by SM C&C
South Korean teen dramas
South Korean romantic comedy television series
South Korean high school television series
Television series about teenagers